Lazar Ćirović (born 26 February 1992) is a Serbian volleyball player, a member of the Serbia men's national volleyball team and Chinese club Jiangsu Volleyball. 2019 European Champion.

Sporting achievements

National championships
 2007/2008  Serbian Cup, with Radnički Kragujevac
 2007/2008  Serbian Championship, with Radnički Kragujevac
 2008/2009  Serbian Championship, with Radnički Kragujevac
 2009/2010  Serbian Championship, with Radnički Kragujevac
 2014/2015  Montenegrin Cup, with Budvanska Rivijera Budva

References

External links
 Player profile at LegaVolley.it 
 Player profile at Volleybox.net 

1992 births
Living people
Serbian men's volleyball players
Sportspeople from Kragujevac
Serbian expatriate sportspeople in Montenegro
Expatriate volleyball players in Montenegro
Serbian expatriate sportspeople in Turkey
Expatriate volleyball players in Turkey
Serbian expatriate sportspeople in Greece
Expatriate volleyball players in Greece
Serbian expatriate sportspeople in Italy
Expatriate volleyball players in Italy
Serbian expatriate sportspeople in China
Expatriate volleyball players in China
European champions for Serbia